The São Nicolau wall gecko (Tarentola nicolauensis) is a species of geckos in the family Phyllodactylidae. The species is endemic to Cape Verde, where it occurs on the islands of São Vicente and São Nicolau. The species was named by Hans Hermann Schleich in 1984.

Taxonomy
Previously a subspecies Tarentola caboverdiana nicolauensis, it was elevated to species status in 2012.

References

Further reading
Schleich, 1984 : Die Geckos der Gattung Tarentola der Kapverden (Reptilia: Sauria: Gekkonidae) [Geckos of the Tarentola Species in Cape Verde]. Courier Forschungsinstitut Senckenberg, vol. 68, p. 95-106. 

substituta
Geckos of Africa
Endemic vertebrates of Cape Verde
Reptiles described in 1984
Fauna of São Vicente, Cape Verde
Fauna of São Nicolau, Cape Verde
Taxa named by Hans Hermann Schleich